The Second season of Bad Girls All-Star Battle premiered on January 7, 2014 with Ray J returning as the host. This season has 16 girls competing, compared to its first season with 14 girls. The season's format has been noted for its enhanced challenges compared to the first season.

Contestants

Returning contestants are in bold.

Contestant progress

Notes
 The contestant won the competition.
 The contestant came in 2nd Place.
 The contestant was eliminated by coming in last in the First Round of a 2 Round Competition.
 The contestant won the Team's Challenge.
 The contestant won the Bad Girls All Star Battle Challenge.
 The contestant won both the Captain's Challenge and the Team's Challenge.
 The contestant won the Captain's Challenge, but lost the Team's Challenge.
 The contestant lost the Team's Challenge or Bad Girls All Star Battle Challenge, but was not put up for elimination.
 The contestant was nominated for elimination and was in the bottom two or the bottom three.
 The contestant was eliminated from the competition.
 The contestant was nominated for elimination, but quit the competition.

This season featured the return of 4 contestants from All Star Battle 1, Danielle Victor, Mehgan James, Paula Hellens and Raquel Santiago.
Rocky broke 2 records. One for winning the first Captain's challenge in both seasons, and for winning 4 individual challenges. The current record for most wins is by Florina Kaja at 5 wins.
Andrea is the shows 4th contestant to quit the competition.
Elease and Mehgan hold the record this season for being put up for elimination the most times being 3 times.
Tiana is the only person in the shows history to make it to the final without ever winning an individual challenge, but ultimately winning the whole season.
Sarah is the only person in the shows history to make it to the final without ever being put up for elimination.

Voting history

Notes

Episodes

Pushed to the Edge
First aired: January 7, 2014

Sixteen bad girls arrive to compete for the $100,000 cash prize. Returning cast members Rocky, Mehgan, Paula, and Danni all feel targeted because of their veteran rank. Old friends Camilla, Danni, and Amy immediately form an alliance, which Valentina suspects and plans to disband. The next day, the girls compete for Team Captain in "The Mud Challenge" which consisted of a limited amount of green balls lined up in a large mud pit. Host Ray J instructs each of the contestants to cross the finish line with a ball, (which was reduced every round) in order to carry on to the next round, and those without a ball would be eliminated. The first winner would be captain of the Gold Team, and second winner captain of the Red Team. Camilla and Rocky win Captain's challenge and select members to be a part of the Red and Gold teams. With the Gold and Red teams formed, the Team Challenge is up next. The Red Team pushes their way to victory, leaving the Gold Team to nominate two of their teammates for elimination. In an effort to break up Camilla's alliance, the Gold Team nominates Amy and Danni for elimination. The first elimination ceremony arrives. With 6 votes, Danni is the first Bad Girl eliminated from the competition.

Captain's Challenge

 The contestant won Team Captain

Team Challenge
Ray J instructs each team to push the other team off a platform above water by pushing a wall that would dump them into the water.

Winner: Red Team
Team Captain: Rocky
Bottom 2: Danni: 6 votes and Amy: 2 votes
Eliminated: Danni

Bad Girl Breakout
First aired: January 14, 2014

After the previous elimination the Gold teams feels relieved. Sarah suspects an alliance between Paula and opposing team member Mehgan, which causes a rift between the Red Team. Camilla and Elease form a secret alliance that no one suspects. Due to health concerns Shelly decides not to compete in the Captains Challenge, but participate in the Team Challenge to support her team. The girls arrive to the "Give Me the Money Honey" Captain's Challenge, each team is instructed to lather up in honey to collect coins and deposit them inside of the piggy bank, the person with the most coins collected wins Team Captain. Sarah and Camilla win the captain's challenge.

For the Team Challenge each team was instructed to free each team member from 6 barriers that held each team. One member of the team would use a saw to free the first teammate from the barrier behind wooden bars. Once that teammate is released those two must use bolt cutters to create a hole in a chain link fence, to free the third teammate, those three team members would then get a ladder to throw over a wooden wall to free the fourth teammate, the four teammates would then knock the solid concrete wall into pieces using a sledgehammer to free the fifth teammate, those five teammates would then use the battering ram to bust the metal door and free the sixth teammate. For the final barrier, the remaining six members must chisel their way through a dry rock wall to free the seventh teammate. Once every barrier is broken, the team that rings the bell first wins the Team Challenge. Tension arises with Andrea, as her team feel offended with her actions during the Team Challenge. The Gold Team is victorious and causes the Red Team to nominate Andrea and Paula. Andrea quits the competition forcing a revote as Paula and Elease being nominees. Elease decides to plea with the Gold Team and during elimination Paula gets emotional as she is eliminated.
Captain's Challenge  Give Me The Money Honey

 The contestant won the challenge and became the Team captain.
 The contestant placed second in the challenge

Team Challenge

Stephanie was chosen to sit out at the Team Challenge

Winner: Gold Team
Team Captain: Camilla
Quit: Andrea
Bottom 2: Elease: 3 votes and Paula: 4 votes
Eliminated: Paula

 The Team won the challenge and became safe from elimination.

What a Tangled Web
First aired: January 21, 2014

Camilla and Amy worry about being outnumbered by the Gold Team. From the previous challenge, Amy suffers injuries on her legs. The girls arrive to the Bad Girls Brain Game (Captain's Challenge), host Ray J instructs each girl to stand inside an open stall to answer questions on geography, pop culture, trivia, and spelling. Every girl eliminated was showered in cow brains and cow blood, while the remaining teammates advance to the next round until the girl with the most correct answers won Team Captain. Janelle and Elease respectively win Team Captain. The Red team worry about Elease's loyalty to them because of her interactions with the Gold Team. For the Team Challenge, Ray J instructs each girl to untangle themselves from knotted ropes while harnessed 30 feet in the air. The Gold Team (with more teammates) pick Alicia to sit out. The Red Team wins, which shocks Elease who attempted to hijack the challenge. Out of frustration, Nancy and Camilla destroy Elease belongings. Elease attempts to explain herself to Camilla which ends with up into a physical altercation. Elease now vulnerable becomes a target to everyone. During nominations for Gold team things get heated as Amy confronts her team about their loyalty. Valentina and Amy are put up as nominees. Meanwhile celebrating victory, Rocky injures her knee yet decides to continue throughout the competition. Amy is eliminated  and Camilla's alliance is weakened. Later, Camilla decides to make amends with Elease.
Captain's Challenge Bad Girl Brain Games

Team Challenge
Each team is harnessed 30 feet in the air and must untangle themselves.
Winner: Red Team
Team Captain: Elease
Bottom 2: Valentina: 2 votes and Amy: 4 votes
Eliminated: Amy

Unbeweaveable
First aired: January 28, 2014

The gold team feel pressured to win from previous elimination. Elease is now a target to both teams. Rocky's knee injury cause her to be unable to compete in the Captain's Challenge. Ray J instructs each team to complete an obstacle course that involves a puzzle (which unlocks a key) to open a box with heels inside. Then to dress in costume to reel in a handbag hooked to on a rope. The last course event; an eating competition. Each contender that finished last couldn't advance to the next course. Shelly and Nancy win Team Captain. Valentina feels Nancy will put her up for nomination because of previous nominations. For the "Tug Of Weave", Team Challenge each team must collect weaves in a one-on-one freestyle tug of war inside a sandpit. Mehgan and Stephanie end up needing medical attention after the challenge, causing the Red Team to hold nominations. Once nominations take place, Stephanie and Elease are put up , though Elease feels as though Tiana should be put up because of her performance during the challenges. The Red Team hope for Elease to be sent home and use Stephanie as a decoy to ensure that. Stephanie gets eliminated and after Tiana confronts Elease for being in alliance with the Gold Team.

Captain's Challenge

 The contestant was eliminated for finishing last on the course

Team Challenge
Each girl is to play in a one on one, freestyle tug of war using a small braided piece of hair weave, while the Team Captain decided the match ups.

 The contestant won a weave for the Red Team.
 The contestant won a weave for the Gold Team.

 Rocky was prohibited from both challenges due to an knee injury
 Mehgan and Stephanie both received medical attention during the Team Challenge, causing the Red Team nominations to be held a day after.
Winner: Gold Team
Team Captain: Nancy
Bottom 2: Elease: 0 votes and Stephanie: 4 votes
Eliminated: Stephanie

Sometimes You Have to Play Dirty
First aired: February 4, 2014

Red Team discuss Elease being in alliance with the opposing team. Camilla and Nancy start to get romantically involved, but others assume Camilla has ulterior motives. For the Captain's Challenge the girls are assigned a male partner to hang onto while he is harnessed onto a crane held over a harbor testing their endurance and strength. Camilla tries to bargain with Janelle to drop down, unsuccessful, Janelle wins Team Captain Elease a target in the competition, comes to avail and wins the Captain's challenge, which infuriates her team. The girls head to the "Battle Bowl" Team Challenge, which Ray J instructs the girls will play a game of flag football in  the mud. The referee flips a coin and the Gold Team starts the game. Sarah injures herself causing Mehgan to confront Sarah and the two almost end up in an altercation. Janelle becomes frustrated with Alicia for taking her position as the center. Though suffering from a bad knee Rocky leads the Red Team to victory.

Janelle and Nancy discuss nomination, Janelle unsure whom to nominate Nancy tries to convince Janelle to save Camilla. Mehgan worries that Camilla's relationship with Nancy isn't genuine. During nomination, the Gold Team decide to vote Alicia, leaving a tiebreaker between Camilla and Mehgan, team captain Janelle nominates Camilla. Elease oversees that Alicia develops a suspicious new friendship with the Red Team after she was nominated. Camilla worries and confides in her secret alliance, Elease who convinces the Red team that Alicia is a threat. During elimination Ray J asks each girl to plea why they should stay in the competition. As Alicia explains herself, she calls out Janelle for being "weak" which causes an argument between the two. Alicia mentions Mehgan for knowing how to "play the game", and which then Camilla calls out Mehgan for being "weak and fake". Camilla walks off the elimination platform to confront Mehgan. As tensions settle, Alicia is eliminated from the competition.

Captain's Challenge

'Team Challenge'
Battle Bowl

Winner: Red Team
Team Captain: Elease
Bottom 2: Alicia: 3 votes and Camilla: 0 votes
Eliminated: Alicia

All Hail The Queen
First aired February 11, 2014

As the episode begins, Janelle and Mehgan are seen having a conversation about the previous elimination . Ray J comes into the house revealing to the girls that there are no more teams and that there will be only one battle challenge, and gifted the girls new uniforms. Though teams were disbanded, Red Team members continued to be an alliance. The girls arrive to the tournament style Battle Challenge and Ray J then reveals that there will be a double elimination, the winner of the challenge would be able to nominate two contestants. In the Battle Challenge, (consisting of 3 rounds) each girl was matched up in a one on-one battle being harnessed back to back by a 7-foot rope. The girl who scores a basket inside the bin first wins that round and advances onto the next. Rocky disqualifies herself and Nancy from advancing to the next round for being unable to score her basket. With a strong strategy Mehgan wins against Shelly, and is the winner of the Battle Challenge. With Mehgan winning, the Red Team becomes fearful.

Rocky feels she will be considered a nominee due to Mehgan wanting vengeance for her elimination last season. Janelle tries to persuade Mehgan to keep Rocky, but Mehgan is obstinate to nominate Camilla and Rocky. Camilla announces she will not plead her case to Mehgan during a conversation with Nancy. Unwillingly, Camilla tries to convince Mehgan to reconsider nominating her for elimination. Sarah, realizing that a third person will be put up for nomination, discusses with her alliance that Janelle would be the best choice in order to disband Mehgan's alliance. Mehgan decides to put Camilla and Rocky up for elimination and Ray J introduces "Bad Girls Revenge" which allowed every girl (except Mehgan) to vote a third girl for elimination. The girls vote results in a tie between Sarah and Janelle, leaving Elease as the deciding factor. Elease sticks to her alliance, voting for Janelle to be put up for elimination. Rocky has a conversation with Elease and convinces her that Camilla is more of a threat to her than she thinks and that it would be her best interest to send her home. Before elimination, Camilla and Elease have a conversation in the bathroom where Camilla makes sure she's secure with Elease. During elimination, as Camilla makes her exit she attacks Elease from behind. After tensions settle Janelle leaves the show leaving Nancy and Mehgan short of a strong alliance.

 Rocky and Nancy were disqualified as, Rocky was unable to score in the bin.

Battle Challenge Winner: Mehgan
Bottom 3: Camilla: 6 votes Janelle: 5 votes Rocky: 3 votes
Eliminated: Camilla and Janelle

Twerk It Out
First aired February 25, 2014

As the episode starts Sarah, Tiana, and Rocky discuss what's to come and that they will eventually have to vote each other out. Nancy feels lonely since Camilla is eliminated. Elease feels relieved since Camilla is gone, and feels she can be trusted within her alliance. Elease states Rocky is her target. Mehgan and Nancy all believe Rocky is only keeping Sarah and Tiana around, because she has an athletic advantage.  The girls arrive to the Battle Challenge "Bad Girls Pentathlon". The first event orders the girls to twerk as fast as possible with pedometers on their back, a luggage toss, hurdle jump in heels, stiletto standing, and a money booth.

Unsurprisingly, Rocky wins the pentathlon. Tiana discusses how she believes Elease would be disloyal to their alliance if she had won, in which Shelly thinks otherwise. Rocky and Shelly get into an heated argument over. In the kitchen Tiana asks Elease who would she had put up for nomination and Elease states she'd choose someone from the Red and Gold alliance. Confiding in Rocky, Tiana tells her of Elease's statement, which persuades Rocky to nominate Elease. During a trip to the club, two guys ask Nancy and Sarah to dance for them and begin to throw money, Rocky begins to collect some of the money thrown on the floor, that causes Nancy to confront Rocky about it. Rocky unsure whom to nominate is stuck between Elease, Mehgan, and Nancy to go up for nomination. Worried she'll be nominated, Mehgan convinces Rocky not to nominate her, Rocky in return asks Mehgan to vow she won't nominate her anytime. Rocky decides to nominate Nancy and Elease, which worries Elease. Mehgan tells Elease that she won't vote for her to go home during a conversation in the closet. During eliminations, Ray J asks Elease to plead her case and she states "[Rocky] She plays dirty and shady" which causes a small argument between the two. Elease is eliminated from the competition with a unanimous decision.

Bad Girls Pentathlon Placements

Winner : Rocky

Runner-Up: Elease

2nd Runner-Up : Valentina

Bottom 2: Elease: 6 votes and Nancy: 0 votes
Eliminated: Elease

Nobody Eats For Free

First aired March 4, 2014

Mehgan feels relieved Camilla is sent home because it restrengthens her alliance with Nancy. Shelly worries she won't win, and relies on her Red Team alliance to save her if she's unable to. Tiana talks to Rocky about how her brothers motivate her during the challenges. The girls head to the Battle Challenge, "The Price of Beauty"  where each girl goes through five eating stunts, that will entail ingesting vile animal parts and blended concoctions, in order to gain face pieces of themselves to cover a barefaced self-portrait. Shelly puts up little effort to win, and goes to cheer on Rocky during the challenge . Rocky wins her second Battle Challenge, and is annoyed with Shelly's performance and reliance on their alliance. Rocky discusses who she wants to nominate and targets Valentina due to her athletic ability. Tiana gets emotional, due to her losing every challenge. Meanwhile, Mehgan becomes annoyed with Rocky and her alliance because she feels Shelly and Sarah aren't independent and rely on Rocky, and feels Rocky keeps them around because their easy competition. Rocky set on nominating Valentina, discusses with Sarah how Mehgan isn't a threat to her and confronts Shelly on being a quitter. During a visit to the club, Sarah notices a surprising new found bond between Mehgan and Shelly, meanwhile Valentina spirals out of control after too many drinks. The Red Team alliance discusses how Shelly is floating by and question her loyalty to their alliance. Rocky decides to nominate Valentina and Mehgan. Valentina is sent home with 3 votes. After elimination, Mehgan and Nancy are heated at the Red Team's reliance on their alliance and Mehgan plots her revenge.

Battle Challenge Winner: Rocky
Bottom 2: Valentina: 3 votes Mehgan: 2 votes 
Eliminated: Valentina

The Battle Dome

First aired March 11, 2014

Ray J wakes the girls up early to ask them what they want to do with the money. Then they go to their next challenge called Bad Girls Battle Dome, which will be played in 3 different rounds. The first round is called Push Over. Players have to push their opponent to get to their flag. The second round is called The Diamond Ring. The 3 girls who win the push over challenge, will compete in this challenge. Each player will hold on to the ring and try to rip it away from the other girls. The first girl to let go of the ring will be eliminated. The final round is called Wrap Up. The final 2 girls will have their right arms tied together by a rope thing and will try and pull the other girl to their specific flag. The girl who gets to their flag first, will win the challenge.
Push Over: Nancy vs. Tiana. Winner: Nancy. Eliminated: Tiana
Sarah vs. Rocky. Winner: Rocky. Eliminated: Sarah.
Mehgan vs. Shelly. Winner: Shelly. Eliminated: Mehgan.

The Diamond Ring: Nancy vs. Rocky vs. Shelly
Winners: Rocky and Shelly. Eliminated: Nancy

Wrap Up: Rocky vs. Shelly
Winner: Rocky
Eliminated: Shelly

Battle Challenge Winner: Rocky
Bottom 3: Mehgan: 0 votes Nancy: 3 votes Shelly: 3 votes 
Eliminated: Nancy, Shelly

Winner Take All

First aired March 18, 2014

First Place Winner: Tiana
Second Place: Sarah
Third Place: Mehgan
Eliminated: Raquel

U.S. Ratings

Notes

References

External links
 

2014 American television seasons
Television shows set in Los Angeles